Russia, as the largest country in the world, has great ethnic diversity, is a multinational state, and is home to over 190 ethnic groups nationwide. According to the population census at the end of 2021, more than 147.1 million people lived in Russia, which is 4.3 million more than in the 2010 census, or 3.03%. At the same time, only 130.587 million census participants indicated their nationality. The top ten largest nations besides Russians included in descending order: Tatars, Chechens, Bashkirs, Chuvash, Avars, Armenians, Ukrainians, Dargins and Kazakhs. During the population census, citizens report their nationality not only by their genetic data, but by their self-determination, inner sense of who a person is by nationality. The 83 (or 85) federal subjects which together constitute the Russian Federation include:

 21 national republics (intended as homes to a specific ethnic minority)
 4 autonomous okrugs (usually with substantial or predominant ethnic minority)
 1 autonomous oblast

Ethnic groups of Russia, 1926–2021

Population pyramids

Future projections 
The ethnic demographic mix of the Russian Federation is projected to change far into the future. The majority population, ethnic Russians, who have been in slight decline since the 1950's will decline further due to a below replacement fertility rate and population ageing. In 2010, rough population projections from Ivan Beloborodov projecting to 2030 estimated that the percentage of Russians within the population would decrease to around 70 to 60% of the total population.

Language and culture

Although the constitution of Russia recognizes Russian as the official language, the individual republics may declare one or more official languages. Many of these subjects have at least two—Russian and the language of the "eponymous" nationality. There is a minority language scene in most subjects of the country, with more than 1,350 newspapers and magazines, 300 TV channels and 250 radio stations in over 50 of these minority languages. Moreover, new legislation allows usage of minority languages in federal radio and TV broadcasting. 

In 2007, there were 6,260 schools which provided teaching in 38 minority languages. Over 75 minority languages were taught as a discipline in 10,404 schools. The Ministers of Council of Europe has noted significant efforts to improve the supply of minority language textbooks and teachers, as well as a greater availability of minority language teaching. However, as Ministers has noted, there remain shortcomings in the access to education of a person(s) belonging to certain minorities. 

There are more than 2,000 national minorities' public associations and 560 national cultural autonomies, however the Committee of Ministers has noted that in many regions, amount of state support for the preservation and development of minority cultures is still inadequate. There's a significant difference between "eponymous" ethnic groups and nationalities without their own national territory, as resources of the last are relatively limited.

Indigenous peoples

Russia is also home to a particular category of minority peoples, i.e. small indigenous peoples of the North and Far East, who maintain very traditional lifestyles, often in a hazardous climatic environment, while adapting to the modern world. After the fall of the Soviet Union, Russia passed legislation to protect rights of these small northern indigenous peoples. 

Gil-Robles has noted agreements between indigenous representatives and oil companies, which are to compensate potential damages on peoples habitats due to oil exploration. As Committee of Ministers of Council of Europe noted in 2007, despite some initiatives for development, the social and economic situation of numerically small indigenous peoples was affected by recent legislative amendments at the federal level, removing some positive measures as regards their access to land and other natural resources.

Maps

See also
 Demographics of Russia
 List of ethnic groups in Russia

Indigenous peoples:
 Indigenous peoples of Siberia
 List of endangered languages in Russia
 List of extinct indigenous peoples of Russia
 List of larger indigenous peoples of Russia
 List of minor indigenous peoples of Russia

References

External links
 Population by mother tongue and districts in 50 Governorates of the European Russia in 1897
 Human Rights problems in Russia: The situation of non-Russian Peoples
 Ethnic and National Minorities of the Russian Federation: A Diversity Based Curriculum for the Intermediate Russian Classroom

 
Social groups of Russia